Badminton at the 1981 Southeast Asian Games was held at Camp Crame Gymnasium, Manila, Philippines. Badminton events was held between 6 December to 15 December.

Medal winners

Final results

Medal table

References

External links 
 Results The Straits Times, 13 December 1981, p. 30
 Results The Straits Times, 14 December 1981, Page 38

1981
Badminton tournaments in the Philippines
1981 Southeast Asian Games events
1981 in badminton